FK Sateska is a football club based in the village of Volino, Debarca Municipality, North Macedonia. They are currently competing in the Macedonian Third League (Southwest Division)

History
The club was founded in 1949.

References

External links
Club info at MacedonianFootball 
Football Federation of Macedonia 

Sateska
Association football clubs established in 1949
1949 establishments in the Socialist Republic of Macedonia
FK